Pierre-Augustin Lefèvre de Marcouville, called Marcouville, (28 October 1723 – 1790) was an 18th-century French lawyer and playwright.

A lawyer in Parlement, he was secretary to Honoré III, Prince of Monaco and wrote a dozen opéras comiques, alone or in collaboration.

Works 
1750: Le Sommeil de Thalie 
1751: Le Mai 
1752: Fanfale 
1754: Bertholde à la ville 
1756: Les Amants trompés 
1757: La Fausse Aventurière, revived the following year under the title La Fausse Esclave, music by Gluck
1757: La Petite Maison 
1758: L'Heureux Déguisement
1758: Le Médecin de l'amour
1760: Le Maître d'école
1760: L'Île des fous

References

External links 
   Pierre-Augustin Lefèvre de Marcouville on 
 Fiche biographique
 His plays and their présentations on CÉSAR

18th-century French dramatists and playwrights
French opera librettists
1723 births
1790 deaths